This is a list of flags in Turkmenistan.

National flag and state flag

Governmental flags

Military flags

Historical flags

See also 

 Flag of Turkmenistan
 Emblem of Turkmenistan

References 

Flags of Turkmenistan
Lists and galleries of flags
Flags